Zibn teg ('Seven Days') was a weekly Yiddish literary newspaper, published in Wilno (then in Second Polish Republic, now Vilnius, Lithuania) in 1935 and the spring of 1936. The newspaper was similar to the banned publication Fraynd, and was printed at the same printing house (Kletzkin) in Wilno. The Polish authorities labelled Zibn teg 'crypto-communist'.

References

Publications established in 1935
Publications disestablished in 1936
Secular Jewish culture in Europe
Yiddish communist newspapers
Weekly newspapers published in Poland
Yiddish-language mass media in Poland
Newspapers published in Vilnius
Defunct newspapers published in Lithuania
Weekly newspapers published in Lithuania
Jews and Judaism in Vilnius